Conospermum stoechadis subsp. sclerophyllum  is a shrub endemic to Western Australia.

Description
As with other forms of C. stoechadis, it grows as an erect, multi-stemmed shrub, with a lignotuber. It has slender needle-like leaves from two to 17 centimetres long and 0.6 to 2.25 millimetres wide, and panicles of white flowers. This subspecies grows to a height of from 0.3 to 1.5 metres, rarely to 2.5 metres, and has tomentose, grey leaves.

Taxonomy
It was first published at species rank as Conospermum sclerophyllum, in John Lindley's 1839 A Sketch of the Vegetation of the Swan River Colony, based on unspecified material. In 1995, Eleanor Bennett demoted it to a subspecies of C. stoechadis in her treatment of Conospermum for the Flora of Australia series of monographs.

Distribution and habitat
It occurs on sandplains of white, grey or yellow sand, or amongst laterite. It extends from Jurien Bay, east to Kulin, and south as far as Wickepin.

Ecology
It is not considered threatened.

References

Eudicots of Western Australia
stoechadis subsp. sclerophyllum
Plant subspecies